E. C. Stearns & Company was a manufacturer of tools and hardware in Syracuse, New York and was organized in 1864 as George N. Stearns Company by George N. Stearns, a wagon maker. During the early years, the company was principally involved in the production of hollow iron tools and specialties, hollow augers, and saw vises.

Advertisements

References

External links 
 US Patent: 14,416 - Boring and mortising machine - Granted: March 11, 1856
 US Patent: 39,841 - Improvements in Hollow Augers - Granted: September 8, 1863
 US Patent: 99,120 - Improvements in horse hay-forks - Granted: January 25, 1870
 US Patent: 110,168 - Improvements in spoke-shaves - Granted: December 13, 1870
 US Patent: 130,826 - Improvements in Hollow Augers - Granted: August 27, 1872
 US Patent: RE7,484 - Improvements in Hollow Augers - Granted: January 30, 1877
 US Patent: 203,384 - Improvements in Hollow Augers - Granted: May 17, 1878
 US Patent: 225,496 - Hollow Auger - Granted: March 16, 1880
 Patents for E. C. Stearns & Co. - Directory of American Tool & Machine Patents
 Stearns Visible Typewriter 1905 - Thomas Fuertig collection

Defunct companies based in Syracuse, New York
Defunct companies based in New York (state)
Companies established in 1864